Presented below is a list of lists of active separatist movements:

List of active separatist movements in Africa
List of active separatist movements in Asia
List of active separatist movements in Europe
List of active separatist movements in North America
List of active separatist movements in Oceania
List of active separatist movements in South America

See also
European Free Alliance, political party that consists of various regionalist, separatist and ethnic minority political parties in Europe
Separatism
List of active separatist movements recognized by intergovernmental organizations
List of active rebel groups
List of rebel groups that control territory
List of anarchist communities
Independence
List of states with limited recognition 
Independence referendum
War of independence
Wars of national liberation
Stateless nation
Irredentism
List of irredentist claims or disputes
Lists of separatist movements

Lists of non-sovereign nations